The Mayflower Classic was a golf tournament on the LPGA Tour from 1976 to 1988. It was played at three different course in Indiana.

Tournament locations

Winners
Bloomington Bicentennial Classic
1976 Sandra Palmer

Mayflower Classic
1977 Judy Rankin
1978 Jane Blalock
1979 Hollis Stacy
1980 Amy Alcott
1981 Debbie Austin
1982 Sally Little
1983 Lauren Howe
1984 Ayako Okamoto
1985 Alice Miller
1986 Sandra Palmer (2)
1987 Colleen Walker
1988 Terry-Jo Myers

References

Former LPGA Tour events
Golf in Indiana
Sports competitions in Indianapolis
1976 establishments in Indiana
1988 disestablishments in Indiana
Recurring sporting events established in 1976
Recurring sporting events disestablished in 1988
History of women in Indiana